Pablo Álvarez Menéndez (born 7 February 1985, in Montevideo) is a Uruguayan footballer. He plays as a right defender for Boston River.

Club career

Nacional
Álvarez began his professional career playing with Club Nacional de Football in 2007. He played the Copa Libertadores where his team got to quarterfinals. Later he won the Liguilla 2007 tournament which qualified his team for the 2008 edition of the Copa Libertadores.

Reggina
His talent did not go unnoticed and he was signed by Reggina on a 4-year contract. He made his Serie A debut on 7 October 2007 against U.S. Città di Palermo.

Wisła Kraków
In July 2009 he was loaned out one season to the Polish giant club Wisła Kraków. He had an excellent campaign with his team getting to the second position in the 2009-2010 league.

Panserraikos
On 31 August 2010, Álvarez signed another loan deal but with the Greek club Panserraikos.

Nacional
On 4 January 2012, he returned to his native country to play for Nacional.

International career
Álvarez has earned one cap with Uruguay on 12 September 2007 against South Africa.

Statistics

Honours

Nacional
 Liguilla 2007

Wisła Kraków

Runner-Up

 Polish League: 2009–10

References

External links
 La Gazzetta
 Profile at Soccerway

1985 births
Living people
Uruguayan footballers
Uruguayan expatriate footballers
Uruguay international footballers
Footballers from Montevideo
Club Nacional de Football players
Club Deportivo Universidad Católica footballers
Reggina 1914 players
Wisła Kraków players
Panserraikos F.C. players
Boston River players
Uruguayan Primera División players
Serie A players
Chilean Primera División players
Ekstraklasa players
Super League Greece players
Expatriate footballers in Chile
Expatriate footballers in Italy
Expatriate footballers in Poland
Expatriate footballers in Greece
Uruguayan expatriate sportspeople in Chile
Uruguayan expatriate sportspeople in Italy
Uruguayan expatriate sportspeople in Poland
Association football defenders